Droxicam is a non-steroidal anti-inflammatory drug of the oxicam class. A prodrug of piroxicam, it is used for the relief of pain and inflammation in musculoskeletal disorders such as rheumatoid arthritis and osteoarthritis.

References 

Dermatoxins
Nonsteroidal anti-inflammatory drugs
2-Pyridyl compounds
Carbamates
Sultams